In 1986, Victor Heredia (Argentine singer-songwriter) composed Taki Ongoy, a conceptual work that recalls Taki Unquy, the political-religious millenarian movement against the invasion of the Spanish culture in South America (1560-1572).

Songs

Text #1
Conversations of the old and wise (Nahuatl - Nuahatlacolli)
Twenty thousand year mother country
Taki Ongoy
The Door of the Cosmos
Text #2   Encounter in Cajamarca
The death of Atahualpa
Text #3 Year 1530: Plague
Aya Marcay Quilla
Taki Ongoy II
The Death of Túpac-Amaru
Text #4 (The Great Diaguita Argentine Native Americans Rise 1630-1643) Don Juan Chalimín
Mutilations
Pedro Chumay's Head
A Piece of my Blood
Text #5 Song for the Death of Juan Chalimín
Text #6 Potosí
Text #7 A Sweet Potter
She Is With Me
A Land Without Memory

See also
Taki Unquy
Inkarri

1986 songs
Argentine songs